Kage Baker (June 10, 1952 – January 31, 2010) was an American science fiction and fantasy writer.

Biography 
Baker was born and raised in Hollywood, California, and lived in Pismo Beach later in life. Before becoming a professional writer she spent many years in theater, including teaching Elizabethan English as a second language. Her unusual first name (pronounced like the word cage) is a combination of the names of her two grandmothers, Kate and Genevieve. Baker had Asperger syndrome.

She is best known for her "the Company/Dr. Zeus, Inc." series of historical time travel science fiction. Her first stories were published in Asimov's Science Fiction in 1997, and her first novel, In the Garden of Iden, by Hodder & Stoughton in the same year. Other notable works include Mendoza in Hollywood (novel, 2000) and "The Empress of Mars" (novella, 2003), which won the Theodore Sturgeon Award and was nominated for a Hugo Award.

In 2008, she donated her archive to the department of Rare Books and Special Collections at Northern Illinois University.

In 2009, her short story "Caverns of Mystery" and her novel House of the Stag were both nominated for World Fantasy Awards, but neither piece won.

In January 2010, it was reported that Baker was seriously ill with cancer. She died from uterine cancer at approximately 1:00 a.m. on January 31, 2010, in Pismo Beach, California. She was survived by five younger siblings, mostly located in southern and central California.

In 2010, Baker's The Women of Nell Gwynne's was nominated for a Hugo Award and a World Fantasy Award in the Best Novella categories. On May 15, 2010, that work was awarded the 2009 Nebula Award in the Best Novella category.

Kage spent much of the last year of her life watching and reviewing silent films. Many of her reviews were collected posthumously into Ancient Rockets: Treasures and Trainwrecks of the Silent Screen (2011), edited by her sister Kathleen Bartholomew. From the foreword:

Baker left an unfinished novel, Nell Gwynne's On Land and At Sea, which has been completed by her sister Kathleen Bartholomew based on extensive notes left by Baker, and was published in 2012.

Partial bibliography

Novels set in the Company universe
In the Garden of Iden (1997)
Sky Coyote (1999)
Mendoza in Hollywood (2000) (published in the UK as At the Edge of the West)
The Graveyard Game (2001)
The Life of the World to Come (2004)
The Children of the Company (2005)
The Machine's Child (2006)
The Sons of Heaven (2007)
 The Empress of Mars (2009) (novel version)
Not Less than Gods (2010) 
Nell Gwynne's On Land and At Sea (2012)

Short story collections set in the Company universe
Black Projects, White Knights: The Company Dossiers (2002)
Gods and Pawns (2007)
 In the Company of Thieves (2013)

Standalone novellas set in the Company universe
 The Empress of Mars (2003) (novella version) 
The Angel in the Darkness (limited edition chapbook, 2003)
Where the Golden Apples Grow (2006) (novella)
Rude Mechanicals (2007)
The Women of Nell Gwynne's (limited edition, 2009) (Also released as 'Nell Gwynne's Scarlet Spy')

Novels set in the universe of The Anvil of the World
The Anvil of the World (2003) 
The House of the Stag (2008) (Prequel to The Anvil of the World)
The Bird of the River (2010)

Other works

Novels and novellas
Or Else My Lady Keeps the Key (2008) (novella)
The Hotel Under the Sand (2009) (juvenile) Tachyon Publications

Short story collections
Mother Ægypt and Other Stories (2004) (title story takes place in the Company universe)
Dark Mondays (2006)
The Best of Kage Baker (2012) (includes stories set in and out of the Company universe)

Non-fiction
Ancient Rockets: Treasures and Trainwrecks of the Silent Screen, ed. Kathleen Bartholomew (2011) Tachyon Publications

References

Further reading

External links

 
 Kathleen, Kage & the Company, blog about Kage by her sister Kate
 Kage Baker entry at the Encyclopedia of Science Fiction
 Kage Baker at Free Speculative Fiction Online
 
Kage Baker silent film reviews at Tor.com

1952 births
2010 deaths
20th-century American novelists
20th-century American short story writers
20th-century American women writers
21st-century American novelists
21st-century American short story writers
21st-century American women writers
American fantasy writers
American science fiction writers
American women novelists
American women short story writers
Nebula Award winners
Novelists from California
People from Hollywood, Los Angeles
People from Pismo Beach, California
People with Asperger syndrome
Women science fiction and fantasy writers
Deaths from cancer in California
Deaths from uterine cancer